Duane Betts (born April 16, 1978) is an American guitarist and singer-songwriter. He is a member of the Allman Betts Band, and leads Duane Betts and the Pistoleers. He was also a guitarist and singer for the Dickey Betts & Great Southern, led by his father, Dickey Betts. He was previously a member of several other groups, including Backbone69, Whitestarr,  Brethren of the Coast, Dawes, and Jamtown.

Early life
Duane Betts was born in Sarasota, Florida, the son of Allman Brothers Band member and co-founder Dickey Betts and his then-wife, known now as Paulette Howell. Duane was named for Duane Allman, Dickey's bandmate who was killed in a motorcycle accident in 1971.

Betts learned to play drums as a youth, then switched to guitar at age 12. At 16, he appeared onstage as a guest with The Allman Brothers Band on June 24, 1994, at the Gerald R. Ford Amphitheatre in Vail, Colorado. Later that summer, he played with the band during its appearance at the Woodstock '94 music festival.

Career 
In 1998, Betts joined Backbone69, a roots-rock band that also included drummer Alex Orbison, bassist Berry Oakley Jr., and lead singer Chris Williams. The group recorded its self-titled debut in 1999 at Ocean Way Nashville Recording Studios, working with producer Bobby Blazier.  It was released on ORBY Records. The group disbanded in 2001 after Williams died as the result of a car crash.

Betts and Orbison formed Whitestarr (2002–2005), with singer Cisco Adler, a group that was signed by Atlantic Records (and later dropped), toured with Kid Rock, and appeared at the 2004 Coachella Festival.

In 2005, his father, Dickey, asked Betts to join Great Southern, formed in the wake of Dickey's parting with The Allman Brothers Band in 2000.  Betts toured both nationally and internationally with the group, appearing on the CD/DVD Dickey Betts & Great Southern: Rockpalast 30 Years of Southern Rock 1978–2008.

Betts formed Brethren of the Coast in 2014. The group included Great Southern bassist Pedro Arevalo on guitar and Betts' former Whitestarr band member Damon Webb on bass, and was the opening artist on Dickey's final tour before retiring.

Betts officially became a touring member of folk-rock band Dawes in May 2015. Though he did not take part in the recording sessions that led to the group's 2015 album, All Your Favorite Bands, he performed with the band for the entire touring cycle of the record, including appearances on The Late Show with David Letterman, the Bonnaroo Festival, and Lollapalooza Berlin.

Reuniting with Adler, Betts joined Jamtown, a group that included Donavon Frankenreiter, G. Love, and Cody Dickinson of the North Mississippi All-Stars. The band released its debut, self-titled EP in the summer of 2017, then undertook a short Western U.S. tour, playing several festivals, including the Malibu Guitar Festival in May, and Monterey Pop 50th and Arroyo Secco Weekend in June, plus two dates supporting Jack Johnson in July, in Denver, Colorado and at the Hollywood Bowl in Los Angeles, California.

In 2017, Betts formed Duane Betts and the Pistoleers as a quartet performing his solo repertoire and covers of blues and rock classics and included guitarist Johnny Stachela.  The two teamed with Gov't Mule's drummer, Matt Abts, and bassist, Jorgen Carlsson, for a one-off July performance in Santa Monica, California as Bando.

A December 8, 2017 appearance at The Fillmore in San Francisco celebrating the late Gregg Allman's 70th birthday coincided with the announcement of a 2018 World Tour with Betts as a supporting artist and guest of the Devon Allman Project with Gregg's son Devon.

In December 2018, Betts and Devon Allman announced the formation of the Allman Betts Band and recorded the group's debut album, Down to the River, at Muscle Shoals Sound Studio. Among the group's members was Berry Oakley Jr., whose father had been a member of the Allman Brothers Band with Gregg Allman and Dickey Betts.

Betts released his debut EP, Sketches of American Music, on April 26, 2018, along with a video, directed by Austin Lynch, of the record's first single, "Taking Time."

The six-song set, with sessions produced by Steve Cropper (Booker T. & the M.G.'s) and Marc Ford (Black Crowes), and executive produced by Betts, contains five originals co-written by Betts and songwriter Stoll Vaughan, as well as a cover of Dickey Betts' "California Blues."

Dickey Betts announced his return from retirement in December 2017. On May 17, 2018, he officially debuted his new band, with Duane Betts returning on guitar, at a concert in Macon, Georgia.

Selected discography 

 Backbone69 – Backbone69 (1999)
 Rockpalast: 30 Years of Southern Rock (1978–2008) – Dickey Betts & Great Southern (2010)
 Jamtown – Jamtown (2017)
 Sketches of American Music – Duane Betts (2018)
 Ramblin' Man: Live at the St. George Theatre – Dickey Betts Band (2019)
 Down to the River – The Allman Betts Band (2019)
 Bless Your Heart – The Allman Betts Band (2020)

References

External links 
 Official Website

Living people
American male singer-songwriters
American male guitarists
Dawes (band) members
Year of birth uncertain
Guitarists from Florida
American rock guitarists
1978 births
Singer-songwriters from Florida